Winstead Hill is a property in Franklin, Tennessee that has significance in 1864 for being in the Second Battle of Franklin battlefield.  It is located within the Franklin Battlefield, a U.S. National Historic Landmark area.

In the battle, Confederate troops under General Hood attacked from Winstead Hill.

It was listed on the National Register of Historic Places in 1974.

See also
Carnton, also NRHP-listed in the battlefield
Fountain Carter House, also NRHP-listed in the battlefield
Fort Granger, also NRHP-listed in the battlefield

References

Conflict sites on the National Register of Historic Places in Tennessee
Franklin, Tennessee
Geography of Williamson County, Tennessee
Tennessee in the American Civil War
National Register of Historic Places in Williamson County, Tennessee